Mandalotus is a genus of weevils in the family Curculionidae. The species are considered crop pests in Australia.

References and notes 

Entiminae